Dushman may refer to:

Films and television 

Dushman (1939 film), a Hindi language film starring K. L. Saigal
Dushman (1957 film), a Hindi language film starring Dev Anand
Dushman (1972 film), a Hindi language film starring Rajesh Khanna
The Enemy (1979 film), a 1979 Turkish drama film
Dushman (1990 film), a Hindi language film directed by Shakti Samanta
Dushman (1998 film), a Hindi language film starring Kajol and Sanjay Dutt
Dushman (2022 series), a 2022 Pakistani drama television series

Drama

Dushman, a 2001 DD Metro drama

People

 David Dushman (1923–2021), German Red Army soldier and fencing trainer
 Saul Dushman (1883–1954), Russian-American physical chemist